Belle Grove, was a sugarcane plantation, on the banks of the Bayou Black, Terrebonne Parish, Louisiana, built in 1847. In 1881, it was purchased by James M. McBride from the Marcellus Daunis heirs.  It was demolished in the 1950s.

See also
Belle Grove Plantation (Iberville Parish, Louisiana)

References

External links
Belle Grove plantation

The Louisiana Planter and Sugar Manufacturer, January 15, 1898, Louisiana Sugar

Sugar plantations in Louisiana
Houses in Terrebonne Parish, Louisiana